Yongwang (literally Dragon King) may refer to:

Yongwangdam or Heaven Lake, a lake on the border between North Korea and China
Yongwang mountain, a mountain in Mok-dong, Yangcheon District, Seoul